Iacobeni is a commune located in Suceava County, in the historical region of Bukovina, northerneastern Romania. It is composed of two villages, namely Iacobeni and Mestecăniș. It included Botoș and Ciocănești villages until 2002, when these were split off to form Ciocănești commune. 

Until the mid 20th century, the commune was also home to a sizable Zipser German community (part of the enlargerd Bukovina German population of the county and the entire historical region) which initially settled here during the late 18th century in the time of the Habsburg monarchy, and later on, Austria-Hungary.

Administration and local politics

Commune council 

The commune's current local council has the following political composition, according to the results of the 2020 Romanian local elections:

Gallery

References 

Communes in Suceava County
Localities in Southern Bukovina
Mining communities in Romania